Daniel la Rosa (born 10 October 1985 in Hanau, West Germany) is a German racing driver.

He has raced in the Formula Renault 3.5 Series and also in the Deutsche Tourenwagen Masters. He is most well known for getting a podium in the opening round of the 2007 DTM season at the Hockenheimring. He also was a test driver in the 2008 Superleague Formula season. He does not race full-time in motorsport anymore.

Racing record

Complete Formula Three Euro Series results
(key) (Races in bold indicate pole position) (Races in italics indicate fastest lap)

† Driver did not finish the race, but was classified as he completed over 90% of the race distance.

Complete Formula Renault 3.5 Series results 
(key) (Races in bold indicate pole position) (Races in italics indicate fastest lap)

Complete DTM results
(key)

References

External links 
 
 Driver Database information

German racing drivers
1985 births
Living people
Superleague Formula drivers
Formula 3 Euro Series drivers
Italian Formula Three Championship drivers
Deutsche Tourenwagen Masters drivers
World Series Formula V8 3.5 drivers
Sportspeople from Hanau
Racing drivers from Hesse
Mercedes-AMG Motorsport drivers
Mücke Motorsport drivers